Jens ter Laak is a German former competitive figure skater from Krefeld. He finished in the top ten at the 1995 World Junior Championships, became the 1997 German senior national bronze medalist, and competed on the ISU Champions Series (later known as the Grand Prix series). He is an international technical specialist for Germany and coaches at DEG Eiskunstlauf e.V. in Düsseldorf.

Competitive highlights 
GP: Champions Series (Grand Prix)

References

Living people
German male single skaters
International Skating Union technical specialists
Sportspeople from Krefeld
Year of birth missing (living people)